The following is a list of events affecting Philippine television in 2003. Events listed include television show debuts, finales, cancellations, and channel launches, closures and rebrandings, as well as information about controversies and carriage disputes.

Events
 March 1 - Sarah Geronimo was hailed as the Star for a Night grand champion.
 September 24 - In an interview on TV Patrol, Kris Aquino, revealed that she incurred a sexually transmitted disease and that she feared for her life when she had a heated argument with her former lover Joey Marquez.
 October 23 - ABS-CBN Broadcasting Corporation celebrates the 50th anniversary of Philippine television and the 50th anniversary of ABS-CBN which unveils the "Kapamilya" branding.
 Unknown - ABS-CBN launched ABS-CBNnow!, an internet-based video-on-demand service featuring ABS-CBN programs primarily targeting the Overseas Filipino Workers across the globe.

Premieres

Unknown date
January: Y Speak on Studio 23
February:
 All My Love on GMA 7
 All About You on GMA 7
June: Lakas Magsasaka on GMA 7
August:
 Tabatina on GMA 7
 The Misadventures of Maverick and Ariel on ABC 5

Unknown
Dial M on NBN 4
Unlimited Diving on NBN 4
Kingdom Upclose on ACQ-KBN 43 Davao
RJ Sunday Jam on RJTV 29
Tipong Pinoy on Studio 23
Detek Kids on ABS-CBN 2
Buhay Pelota on SBN 21
Friends Again on SBN 21
Saklolo Abugado on NBN 4
Mirai Sentai Timeranger on ABS-CBN 2
Dong Puno Tonight on ABS-CBN 2
Gourmet Everyday on ABC 5
Look Who's Talking on ABC 5
Pops Talk Show on ABC 5
Crayon Shin-chan on ABC 5
I-Barangay Mo! on IBC 13
Pilipinas Ngayon on IBC 13
Entrepinoy Start-Up on IBC 13
BYK101 on IBC 13
Bitag on IBC 13
LakbayTV on IBC 13
AM @ IBC on IBC 13
Global Family Series on IBC 13
Kids To Go on RPN 9
Cerge for Truth on RPN 9
Direct Line on RPN 9
The Imelda Papin Show on RPN 9
RPN Forum on RPN 9
Prangkahan on RPN 9
Ratsada Balita on RPN 9
Ugnayang Pambansa on RPN 9
Cathedral of Praise on RPN 9
Friends Again on RPN 9
Jesus The Healer on RPN 9
Kerygma TV on RPN 9
Fistorama on RPN 9
Golf Power on RPN 9
In This Corner on RPN 9
Largo on RPN 9
John Doe on RPN 9
Madam Ratsa Live! on RPN 9
NBA Jam on RPN 9
 Carita de Ángel on RPN 9
 Por un beso on RPN 9
Magbuhay Professional on NBN 4
Problema N'yo, Sagot Ko! on NBN 4
Luisa on ABS-CBN 2
Solita Mi Amor on ABS-CBN 2
George Shrinks on GMA 7
Maria La Del Barrio on GMA 7
Slam Dunk on GMA 7
Kachorra on GMA 7
The Berenstain Bears on GMA 7
Rosalinda on GMA 7
Kakabakaba Adventures on GMA 7
Let’s Go on GMA 7
Monster Rancher on GMA 7
Virtua Fighter on GMA 7
Doraemon on GMA 7
Magic Knight Rayearth on GMA 7
Ghost in the Shell on GMA 7
Rotten Ralph on GMA 7
Bill and Ben on GMA 7
Zoids on GMA 7
Miki Loves Yuu on GMA 7
Paulina on GMA 7
Kachorra on GMA 7
In Love With Angel on GMA 7
Ghost Fighter on GMA 7
Voltes V on GMA 7
 Maria del Carmen (GMA 7)

Returning or renamed programs

Programs transferring networks

Finales
 January 10: Recuerdo de Amor (ABS-CBN 2)
 January 17: Little Ana (GMA 7)
 January 24: Adriana (GMA 7)
 January 31: Detective Conan (GMA 7)
 February 8: Barkadahan sa S na S (ABS-CBN TV-4 Bacolod)
 February 14:
 Flame of Recca (GMA 7)
 Sa Puso Ko Iingatan Ka (ABS-CBN 2)
 February 21: 
 Magandang Tanghali Bayan (ABS-CBN 2)
 Salomé (GMA 7)
 Pira-pirasong Pangarap (GMA 7)
 February 28: Sa Dulo ng Walang Hanggan (ABS-CBN 2)
 March 1: Star for a Night (IBC 13)
 March 9: The Price Is Right (ABC 5)
 March 15: Tanging Yaman, The Series (ABS-CBN 2)
 March 21: RPN NewsBreak (RPN 9)
 March 29: Saturday Night Specials (ABC 5)
 April 11: Ang Iibigin ay Ikaw (GMA 7)
 April 23: Beh Bote Nga (GMA 7)
 April 25: 
 Make Way for Noddy (GMA 7)
 Sana Ay Ikaw Na Nga (GMA 7)
 May 2:
 E.T.C. (ABS-CBN 2)
 Isyu (ABS-CBN 2)
 May 3: FPJ Action Cinema (ABS-CBN 2)
 May 16: Knockout (GMA 7)
 May 23: Bituin (ABS-CBN 2)
 June 6: Kung Mawawala Ka (GMA 7)
 June 20: 
 Shaman King (GMA 7)
 Joe Millionaire (Studio 23)
 June 22: Cheche Lazaro Presents (GMA 7)
 July 6: Kahit Kailan (GMA 7)
 July 11: Twin Stars (GMA 7)
 July 11: María Belén (GMA 7)
 July 25:
 Meteor Garden (ABS-CBN 2)
 ABS-CBN Headlines (ABS-CBN 2)
 August 8: Meteor Rain (ABS-CBN 2)
 August 9: Arriba, Arriba! (ABS-CBN 2)
 August 10: Home Along Da Riles (ABS-CBN 2)
 August 15: Slam Dunk (GMA 7)
 August 18: Harsh Realm (RPN 9)
 August 21: Gus Abelgas Nag-Uulat (ABS-CBN 2)
 August 22: Ang Iibigin ay Ikaw Pa Rin (GMA 7)
 August 27: Mission X (ABS-CBN 2)
 August 29:
 Nagmamahal, Manay Gina (GMA 7)
 Daimos (GMA 7)
 Lavender (GMA 7)
 Martin Late @ Nite (ABS-CBN 2)
 August 30: Family Rosary Crusade (ABS-CBN 2)
 September 7: Blockbuster Cinema (GMA 7)
 September 12: My MVP Valentine (GMA 7)
 September 13: S2: Showbiz Sabado (ABS-CBN 2)
 September 19:
 Alice in Wonderland (GMA 7)
 Poor Prince (GMA 7)
 September 23: Milyun-Milyon Na, Game KNB? (ABS-CBN 2)
 September 26: Bright Girl (GMA 7)
 September 27: Rosalinda (GMA 7)
 October 13: Kool Ka Lang (GMA 7)
 October 14: Da Boy en Da Girl (GMA 7)
 October 17: Habang Kapiling Ka (GMA 7)
 October 19: Tabing Ilog (ABS-CBN 2)
 October 24:
 Endless Love: Autumn in My Heart (GMA 7)
 Global News (ABS-CBN 2)
 October 31: 
 Meteor Garden II (ABS-CBN 2)
 Thieves (Studio 23)
 November 1: Willingly Yours (ABS-CBN 2)
 November 7: Hawak Ko ang Langit (GMA 7)
 November 9: Magic Knight Rayearth (GMA 7)
 November 14:
 Marmalade Boy (GMA 7)
 Secretly in Love (GMA 7)
 Darating ang Umaga (ABS-CBN 2)
 Kay Tagal Kang Hinintay (ABS-CBN 2)
 November 15: F! (ABS-CBN 2)
 November 17: My Love, Cindy (GMA 7)
 November 23: Inday Heart To Heart (GMA 7)
 November 25: The Probe Team (GMA 7)
 November 28: Katri, Ang Batang Pastol (GMA 7)
 November 29: Kidcetera (IBC 13)
 December 5:
 Beautiful Days (GMA 7)
 Meteor Fever in Manila (ABS-CBN 2)
 December 12: Lunch Break (IBC 13)
 December 13: Amazing Twins (IBC 13)
 December 14: PBA on NBN/IBC (NBN 4 and IBC 13)

Unknown date
 January:
 Ecomoda (ABS-CBN 2)
 Betty La Fea (GMA 7)
 August: All My Love (GMA 7)

Unknown
 Bitag (ABC 5)
 Paloma (ABS-CBN 2)
 Romantica (ABS-CBN 2)
 Daniela (ABS-CBN 2)
 Altagracia (ABS-CBN 2)
 Cristina (ABS-CBN 2)
 Star Studio Presents (ABS-CBN 2)
 Citiline (Studio 23)
 Amazing Lifestyle (SBN 21)
 PLDT Playtym (GMA 7)
 Ready, Txt, Go! (GMA 7)
 Sesame Street (GMA 7)
 Charlotte (GMA 7)
 MariMar (GMA 7)
 Hunter X Hunter (GMA 7)
 George Shrinks (GMA 7)
 Maria La Del Barrio (GMA 7)
 Ángela (GMA 7)
 Dragon Ball Z (GMA 7)
 Strangebrew (UNTV 37)
 Kakabakaba (GMA 7)
 Sonic Underground (GMA 7)
 Pokémon (GMA 7)
 Gadget Boy (GMA 7)
 Rotten Ralph (GMA 7)
 Bill and Ben (GMA 7)
 Mojacko (GMA 7)
 Doraemon (GMA 7)
 The Berenstain Bears (GMA 7)
 Ghost in the Shell (GMA 7)
 Baki the Grappler (GMA 7)
 Zoids (GMA 7)
 Task Force Siyasat (ABC 5)
 Chinese Variety Show (ABC 5)
 Pygmalio (ABC 5)
 Fancy Lala (ABC 5)
 F (ABC 5)
 Lois and Clark: The New Adventures of Superman (ABC 5)
 Sabrina, the Teenage Witch (ABC 5)
 Pet Ko! (GMA 7)
 Batang Batibot (GMA 7)
 Disney Adventures (GMA 7)
 Off the Record (ABS-CBN 2)
 Myx sa Dos (ABS-CBN 2)
 Smart Amazing Dreams (ABS-CBN 2)
 Dong Puno Nightly (ABS-CBN 2)
 Klasmeyts (ABS-CBN 2)
 Hiraya Manawari (ABS-CBN 2)
 I-Barangay Mo! (IBC 13)
 People First (IBC 13)
 Nora Mismo (IBC 13)
 Trash en Traffic (IBC 13)
 Pilipinas Ngayon (IBC 13)
 The Finest Hour (IBC 13)
 Sinemaks (IBC 13)
 Viva Box Office (IBC 13)
 Hour of Power (IBC 13)
 Carita de Ángel (IBC 13)
 Por un beso (IBC 13)
 Akazukin Chacha (IBC 13)
 Crayon Shin-chan (IBC 13)
 Cyborg Kuro-chan (IBC 13)
 Beyblade (ABS-CBN 2)
 Sakura Wars (ABS-CBN 2)
 Final Fantasy: Unlimited (ABS-CBN 2)
 Crush Gear Turbo (ABS-CBN 2)
 Cooking Master Boy (ABS-CBN 2)
 Super Gals (ABS-CBN 2)
 Project Arms (ABS-CBN 2)
 Yu-Gi-Oh! Duel Monsters (ABS-CBN 2)
 Luks Family (RPN 9)
 Match TV (RPN 9)
 Metro TV (RPN 9)
 Side Stitch (RPN 9)
 In3 (RPN 9)
 Carita de Ángel (RPN 9)
 Por un beso (RPN 9)
 Eskwela ng Bayan (NBN 4)
 Task Force Siyasat (NBN 4)
 Love Scar (ABS-CBN 2)
 E! News Live (E! Philippines)
 Wild On! (E! Philippines)
 Extreme Close Up (E! Philippines)
 Mysteries and Scandals (E! Philippines)
 Fashion Emergency (E! Philippines)
 CBS Evening News (E! Philippines)
 Late Show With David Letterman (E! Philippines)

Channels

Launches
 August 1: Pinoy Box Office

Unknown
 GKTV 3/PCTV 3
 Prime Channel
 Real Cebu Television

Closures

Unknown
 Viva TV on IBC 13

Births
February 14 - Zephanie Dimaranan, singer
March 6 - 
Jehramae Trangia, singer
Shanelle Agustin, actress
March 12 - Andrea Brillantes, actress
March 25 - Yen Quirante, actress
March 26 - Awra Briguela, actor and singer
March 31 - Carl Acosta, actor and dancer
May 13 - Rita Gaviola, actress
August 19 - Harvey Bautista, actor
September 13 - Ashley Del Mundo, actress
October 13 - Ar Angel Aviles, actress
October 22 – Lie Reposposa, singer and actress
November 8 - Mikha Lim, singer and actress
November 22 - Reign Parani, actress
December 27 - Louise Abuel, actor

Deaths
 March 23 - Amado Cortez, former actor and diplomat (born 1928)
 April 9 - Rod Navarro, former TV host, actor, and radio commentator (born 1936)
July 18 - César Ramírez, former actor and father of the late Ace Vergel (born 1929) 
July 19 -
 Oscar Moreno, former actor and father of Boots Anson-Roa (born 1921) 
 Vic Vargas, former actor (born 1939)
 September 26 - Inday Badiday, Filipino host and journalist who was known as Philippine television's "queen of showbiz talk shows" and "queen of intrigues" (born 1944) 
 November 14 - Carding Castro, former singer-comedian and singing comic duo Reycard Duet (born 1935)
 December 5 - Fred Montilla, former actor (born 1919)
 December 29 - Miko Sotto, former young actor and son of actress Ali Sotto (born 1982)

See also
2003 in television

References

 
Television in the Philippines by year
Philippine television-related lists